Wind power in Nebraska remains largely untapped in comparison with its potential. In the Great Plains, with more than 47,000 farms and open skies it ranks near the top in the United States in its ability to generate energy from wind. As of 2015, the state had not adopted a renewable portfolio standard. Omaha Public Power District (OPPD) is one of the state's largest purchasers of wind energy.

In 2016, Nebraska had 1,335 MW of installed wind power generation capacity, producing 10.1% of the electricity generated in-state. This increased to a capacity of 2,142 MW and a 19.92% of generation in 2019.

Wind for Schools
An initiative of the Department of Energy, the Wind for Schools program supported the construction of small scale wind turbines at schools throughout state to encourages the incorporation of renewable energy education into the science curriculum. In Nebraska, wind turbines were installed at twenty-five K-12 schools, four community colleges and the Wind Applications Center at the University of Nebraska-Lincoln. Locations include various elementary and high schools, and community colleges including those Bancroft, Bloomfield, Cedar Rapids, Crawford, Creighton, Diller-Odell High School, Elkhorn Valley, Hastings, Hayes Center, Hyannis, Logan View, Loup City, Merdian-Daykin, Mullen, Norfolk, Norris, Oshkosh, Papillion-LaVista South High School, Pleasanton, Superior, West Holt and Southeast Community College.

Utility installations

Nebraska's first utility-scale wind project with two 750 kW Zond wind turbines came on-line in 1998 west of Springview and operated until 2007.

Statistics

Source:

See also

Solar power in Nebraska
Wind power in the United States
Renewable energy in the United States

References